Azzedine Bousseksou, born 2 December 1964 in Kouba, Algeria, is a Franco-Algerian physical chemist.

Career 
Azzedine Bousseksou attended high school in Algiers, where he received a diploma in Material Physics from the Université de Bab Ezzouar. He also received a DEA in Materials Science from the University of Nantes in 1988 and then obtained a PhD in Materials Science from the Pierre and Marie Curie University in Paris in 1992, completing his doctoral internship at the Inorganic Chemistry Laboratory of Johannes Gutenberg University of Mainz .

Bousseksou began his career at the CNRS Coordination Chemistry Laboratory in Toulouse as a research fellow in 1993. In January 2003, while in charge of Research at the LCC-CNRS Toulouse, he created and directed the scientific team "Switchable Molecular Materials". At the same time, between 2005 and 2009, he directed the GDR Magnétisme et Commutation Moléculaires and co-coordinated the GDRI France-Japan on multifunctional molecular materials between 2006-2010. Between 2011 and 2013, he was Deputy Director of the LCC-CNRS Toulouse, and has been Director since 2013. Azzedine Bousseksou was a member of the CNRS national committee for the evaluation of researchers and research laboratories over the periods 2000 to 2004 and 2010 to 2015 and has coordinated and/or led several European, national, and regional projects. He has been a member of the European Network of Excellence on Molecular Magnetism, REX MAGMANET and is a member of the European Institute on Molecular Magnetism (EIMM).

Scientific research 
He developed three complementary conceptual approaches alongside his team. These are :

    The transition from spin & Nano-Electronic Transport (molecular spintronics) with the setting up of the very first molecular devices allowing the coupling of a spin state with electronic transport in a nanometric junction,
    The transition from spin & optics: towards high-performance photonic devices with the implementation of Nano-Thermometric Sensors (patented) that surpass current commercial devices,
    Spin transition & reversible variation of molecular volume with the realization of the first Nano-Actuators with controlled direction whose chemical combination with polymers allowed the implementation of active materials "artificial muscles" with advanced applications in robotics and Micro-Nano-Mechanics.

With his research team made up of 3 other permanent staff members (Gabor Molnar, DR-CNRS, Lionel Salmon DR-CNRS and William Nicolazzi, MCF-Université Paul Sabatier), among his most remarkable achievements are the following:

    The development of the lsing-type model with two electronic levels for one- and two-step spin transition with prediction of symmetry breaks.
    The discovery of the first magneto-switching by the application of an intense magnetic field (32 Tesla) pulsed into the hysteresis cycle of a spin transition molecule (Fe(Phen)2(NCS)2) allowing the information to be addressed from the high spin (HS) state to the low spin (BS) state, by a nucleation growth phenomenon whose dynamic effects are the subject of particular attention at the experimental and theoretical levels.
    The discovery of the first hysteresis of the dielectric constant in spin-transition complexes.
    The discovery of the first double photo-switching in binuclear spin-transition compounds
    The first photo-switching at room temperature.
    The first synthesis of spin-transition thin films at room temperature (new layer-by-layer concept for spin transition).
    The first Nano-Structuring of Bistable materials with spin transition at room temperature.
    The synthesis of the smallest spin-transition coordination nanoparticles (4 nm) with hysteresis around room temperature.
    The original synthesis of a hybrid system combining spin transition and fluorescence for the purpose of detecting the spin transition property on the single Nano-Object.
    The development of a new generation of active devices based on photonic/plasmonic spin-transition materials, diffractive gas sensors, Nano-Thermometers and also Nano-Electronics, and spintronic devices.
    The recent development of switchable molecular materials for direction-controlled micro- and Nano-Actuation by exploiting the reversible volume variation of spin-transition molecules (development of the first artificial muscle prototypes) with thermo- or photo-induced actuation for robotic applications (ERC 2019 project under evaluation).

Its research team is therefore considered today as a world leader in the field of Molecular Bistability.

He has supervised about twenty post-doctoral students and more than thirty theses.

He has registered 12 patents, 2 of which are being exploited, and one Startup in incubation.

He is a member of 4 academies: the French Academy of sciences (2013), founding member of the Algerian Academy of sciences and technologies -AAST- (2015), member of the European Academy of sciences and arts (2012) and member of the European Academy of sciences (2014).

Awards

Prizes 
 Prestigious Süe Prize of the French Society of Chemistry, 2020
 Korean Magnetic Society Award, 2012
 Prix la Recherche, Chemistry section, 2011
 Langevin Prize of the French Academy of sciences (FR), 2009
 SCF Co-ordination Chemistry Division Award, 2003

Honors 

 Winner of the national Smart Grids ERDF 2016 competition
 Medal of the University of Montpellier, 2014
 CNRS Silver Medal, 2010
 Visiting Professor, Lecturer University of Mexico City, Mexico (1 month), 2017
 Visiting Professor (18 months) at Queen's University of Belfast, UK, 1997

Scholarly Associations - Academies 

 Member of the French Academy of sciences, 2013
 Member of the European Academy of sciences, 2014
 Member of the European Academy of sciences and arts, 2012
 Founding member of the Algerian Academy of science and technology, 2015
 Member of the National Committee of the National Research Council, Section 14 (200-2004) and (2012-2016)
 Member of the European Institute on Molecular Magnetism (EIMM)
 Guest Editor, Coordination Chemistry Reviews, Elsevier, 2016
 Guest Editor, International Journal of Molecular Sciences, MDPI, 2011
 Guest Editor, New Journal of Chemistry, RCS, 2008
 Coordination of the special issue of the Comptes Rendus Rendus of the Académie des sciences on the phenomenon of spin transition, 2018

References

External links 
 https://www.lcc-toulouse.fr
 http://www.eimm.eu EIMM
 http://www.gdr-mcm2.cnrs.fr/

1964 births
People from Kouba
21st-century French chemists
Research directors of the French National Centre for Scientific Research
French National Centre for Scientific Research awards
Members of the French Academy of Sciences
Members of the European Academy of Sciences and Arts
Living people